Sobienie-Jeziory  is a village in Otwock County, Poland. As of 2000, the population was 700. From 1975 to 1998 the village was in Siedlce Voivodeship. It is the capital of a local gmina (township).

External links
 Jewish Community in Sobienie-Jeziory on Virtual Shtetl

Villages in Otwock County
Siedlce Governorate
Lublin Governorate
Lublin Voivodeship (1919–1939)
Warsaw Voivodeship (1919–1939)